Saskatoon—Dundurn was a federal electoral district in Saskatchewan, Canada, that was represented in the House of Commons of Canada from 1988 to 1997.

This riding was created in 1987 from parts of Humboldt—Lake Centre, Saskatoon East and Saskatoon West ridings

It was abolished in 1996 when it was redistributed into Blackstrap and Saskatoon—Rosetown ridings.

Members of Parliament

The following were the Members of Parliament for the riding:

 Ron Fisher, New Democratic Party (1988–1993)
 Morris Bodnar, Liberal (1993–1997)

Election results

|-

See also 

 List of Canadian federal electoral districts
 Past Canadian electoral districts

External links 

Former federal electoral districts of Saskatchewan